Attorney General Garrick may refer to:

James Francis Garrick (1836–1907), Attorney General of Queensland
Joseph Garrick (1846–1908), Attorney General of Fiji